Hana Kafková (born 26 June 1965) is a Czech rower. She competed in the women's quadruple sculls event at the 1992 Summer Olympics.

References

1965 births
Living people
Czech female rowers
Olympic rowers of Czechoslovakia
Rowers at the 1992 Summer Olympics
Rowers from Prague